Settrington is a village and civil parish in the Ryedale district of North Yorkshire, England, about 3 miles (5 km) east of Malton. It was historically part of the East Riding of Yorkshire until 1974.

History
Sir Francis Bigod of Settrington launched Bigod's Rebellion against King Henry VIII in January 1537.

Settrington was served by Settrington railway station on the Malton and Driffield Railway between 1853 and 1950.

References

External links

Villages in North Yorkshire
Civil parishes in North Yorkshire